Bolshebereznikovsky District (Pokš Kilejbuje; , Otsü Kelunoń ajmak) is an administrative and municipal district (raion), one of the twenty-two in the Republic of Mordovia, Russia. It is located in the southeast of the republic. Its administrative center is the rural locality (a selo) of Bolshiye Berezniki. As of the 2010 Census, the total population of the district was 14,072, with the population of Bolshiye Berezniki accounting for 45.4% of that number.

Administrative and municipal status
Within the framework of administrative divisions, Bolshebereznikovsky District is one of the twenty-two in the republic. The district is divided into fifteen selsoviets which comprise thirty-five rural localities. As a municipal division, the district is incorporated as Bolshebereznikovsky Municipal District. Its fifteen selsoviets are incorporated into fifteen rural settlements within the municipal district. The selo of Bolshiye Berezniki serves as the administrative center of both the administrative and municipal district.

See also
 Degilyovka

References

Notes

Sources

Districts of Mordovia
 
